This is a comprehensive list of notable Azerbaijani scientists and philosophers, arranged alphabetically.

Scientists and philosophers 
Ali Abbasov — physicist, specialized in the field of microelectronics
Hasan Abdullayev — Lenin-prize winning physicist, specialized in the field of semiconductors research, President of the Azerbaijan Academy of Sciences in 1970-1983
Zarifa Aliyeva — ophthalmologist, devised and introduced new methods for treatment of ocular diseases
Ahliman Amiraslanov — oncologist, professor and rector of Azerbaijan Medical University
Hamid Arasly — philologist, specialized in Azerbaijani literary studies, history and linguistics
Adil Asadov — philosopher, specialized in aesthetics, philosophy of thinking, philosophy of politics 
Abbasgulu Bakikhanov — philosopher, historian and writer, founder of Azerbaijani scientific historiography
Seyid Yahya Bakuvi — scientist and philosopher of the late medieval era in the fields of mathematics and astronomy
Vagif Guliyev — mathematician, specializes in the fields lie groups and homogeneous spaces
Zumrud Gulu-zade — philosopher, professor of philosophy at the Azerbaijan National Academy of Sciences
Elshan Hajizadeh — economic scientist, specialized in the problems of economy and management of fuel and energy complex
Ashraf Huseynov — mathematician, first to study the nonlinear Hilbert problem as applied to analytic functions, created the Hα, β, γ function space and proved some theorems for nonlinear singular integral equations with Cauchy kernel within that space
Heydar Huseynov — philosopher, specialized in dialectical materialism
Nadir Ibrahimov — astrophysicist, astronomer of the Shamakhy Astrophysical Observatory of the Azerbaijan National Academy of Sciences, Ibragimov crater on Mars is named in his honor
Hamlet Isakhanli — mathematician, science writer, founder of Khazar University
Ishag Jafarzadeh — archeologist, a pioneer of archaeology and ethnography in Azerbaijan
Ali Javan — physicist and inventor at MIT with main contributions in the fields of quantum physics and spectroscopy, co-inventor of the gas laser
Alexander Kazembek —  philologist,  organizer of the Russian Oriental Studies
George Kechaari — philologist, specialized in the Udi language
Dzhangir Kerimov — philosopher, specializes in philosophical problems of legal science, social planning and administration, theory of state and law
Kerim Kerimov — rocket scientist, one of the founders of the Soviet space industry, for many years a central figure in the Soviet space program, Hero of Socialist Labor
Yusif Kerimov — electrical engineer and inventor
Salahaddin Khalilov — philosopher, specializes in philosophy of science, science about science, philosophical comparativism, phenomenology, philosophical aspects of Eastern and Western Civilizations, philosophy of Abu Turkhan and cognitive theory
Zahid Khalilov —  mathematician and engineer, solved the boundary value problem for polyharmonic equations, proposed abstract generalizations of singular integral operators, founder of the Azerbaijani functional analysis school
Firudin bey Kocharli — philologist, writer and literary critic
Fuad Mamedov — social scientist, specializes in culturology, founder of Culturology in Azerbaijan, President of Cultural Association Simurgh
Vasim Mammadaliyev — philosopher and theologian, specializes in oriental studies and Arabic philology
Yusif Mammadaliyev — chemist, founder of petrochemical science in Azerbaijan
Garib Mammadov — agronomist
Yaqub Mammadov — physiologist, specializes in pathophysiology
Zakir Mammadov — philosopher, specializes in Eastern philosophy, especially history of Azerbaijani philosophy
Izzet Orujova — chemist, specialized in oil
Mirali Qashqai — geologist in the fields of geomorphology and stratigraphy
Arif Salimov — mathematician, known for research in differential geometry
Farman Salmanov — geologist, first discovered oil fields in Siberia, Hero of Socialist Labor
Movlazadeh Mahammad Hasan Shakavi — philosopher, theologian, alim, first Sheikh ul-Islam of the Caucasus, first scholar who translated the Koran into the Azerbaijani language
Zeynalabdin Shirvani — philosopher, poet, traveller and geographer of the pre-Tsarist era
Hajibey Sultanov — astronomer
Lotfi A. Zadeh —  mathematician, electrical engineer, computer scientist, founder of the fuzzy set theory and fuzzy logic

References 

Scientists And Philosophers

Lists of European scientists
Lists of philosophers